Epipremnum aureum is a species in the arum family Araceae, native to Mo'orea in the Society Islands of French Polynesia. The species is a popular houseplant in temperate regions but has also become naturalised in tropical and sub-tropical forests worldwide, including northern South Africa, Australia, Southeast Asia, South Asia, the Pacific Islands and the West Indies, where it has caused severe ecological damage in some cases.

The plant has a number of common names including golden pothos, Ceylon creeper, hunter's robe, ivy arum, house plant, money plant, silver vine, Solomon Islands ivy, marble queen, and taro vine. It is also called devil's vine or devil's ivy because it is almost impossible to kill and it stays green even when kept in the dark. It is sometimes mistakenly labeled as a Philodendron, Pothos or Scindapsus in plant stores. It is commonly known as a money plant in many parts of the Indian subcontinent. It rarely flowers without artificial hormone supplements; the last known spontaneous flowering in cultivation was reported in 1964.

The plant has gained the Royal Horticultural Society's Award of Garden Merit.

History and etymology
This species has been assigned to a number of genera. In 1880 when it was first described, it was named Pothos aureus, which is in part why it is often commonly referred to as a "pothos". After a flower was observed in 1962, it was given the new name of Rhaphidophora aurea. However, after closer examination of the flower, researchers noticed its heightened similarity to Epipremnum pinnatum and synonymised it with that species. Only after closer observation of the entirety of the plant, including the leaves and growth patterns, did researchers again separate it from E. pinnatum, and classify it as E. aureum.

Description

This plant produces trailing stems when it climbs up trees and these take root when they reach the ground and grow along with it.

Shy-flowering nature
While E. aureum is classified as an angiosperm, which typically produce flowers at some point in their life cycle, it is the only reported species in its family (Araceae) that does not develop a flower. Regardless of where this “shy-flowering” plant is grown or what the conditions are like, it will not flower due to a genetic impairment of the gibberellin (GA) biosynthetic gene, EaGA3ox1. This impairment causes the plant to be unable to develop bioactive GAs, which is what is responsible for the flowering of plants via the floral meristem identity gene EaLFY. In E. aureum, the floral meristem identity gene expression is absent due to the lack of GAs from EaGA3ox1. It was found that when GAs were experimentally sprayed onto the plant, flowering was induced.

Distribution
Originally, it was endemic to the island of Mo'orea from the Society Islands. However, it is now wild in many tropical countries. The following ranges are indicated: Bangladesh, India, Myanmar, Thailand, Vietnam, People's Republic of China (Hainan, Hong Kong), Taiwan, Japan (Ryukyu Islands, Ogasawara Islands, Bonin Islands), Malaysia (the peninsula, Sabah and Sarawak), Singapore, Indonesia (Java, Maluku Islands, Nusa Tenggara, Sulawesi, Sumatra), Philippines, Solomon Islands, Vanuatu, New Caledonia, New Guinea, Australia (Queensland), Marshall Islands, Hawaii, Palau, Fiji, Tonga, Cook Islands, and Western Samoa.

Cultivation and uses 

In temperate regions, it is a popular houseplant with numerous cultivars selected for leaves with white, yellow, or light green variegation. It is often used in decorative displays in shopping centers, offices, and other public locations largely because it requires little care and is also attractively leafy. In tropical countries, it is found in many parks and gardens and tends to grow naturally.

The best results are achieved by providing indirect light; it tolerates an intense luminosity, but long periods of direct sunlight burn the leaves. Generally, the plant will only need watering when the soil feels dry to the touch (typically once every one to two weeks). A liquid fertilizer can be added in the spring and it must be replanted every two years. However, it is a very robust plant that supports bad growing conditions. The plant grows rapidly in hydroponic culture.

It can be cultivated from a cutting, a part of a plant used in plant propagation. Cuttings, however, can carry various diseases such as Erwinia leaf spot, Pythium root rot, Rhizoctonia root rot (Rhizoctonia foot rot), Pseudomonas leaf spot, Southern blight, and Xanthomonas blight.

The plant can remove indoor pollutants such as formaldehyde, trichloroethene, toluene, xylene, and benzene in controlled circumstances (e.g. a sealed room). A study found that this effect declined as the molecular weight of the polluting substance increased.

The plant is sometimes used in aquariums, placed on top of the aquarium, and allowed to grow roots in the water. This is beneficial to the plant and the aquarium as it absorbs many nitrates and uses them for growth.

Cultivars  
There are several cultivars known in the houseplant community. Common names for them used in the houseplant community include Golden Pothos, Neon Pothos, N'joy, Pearls n' Jade, Marble Queen, Jade, Manjula, Global Green, and Snow Queen.

Toxicity 
The plant is listed as toxic to cats and dogs by the ASPCA, because of the presence of insoluble raphides. Care should be taken to ensure the plant is not consumed by pets.  Symptoms may include oral irritation, vomiting, and difficulty in swallowing.

Due to the calcium oxalate within the plant, it can be mildly toxic to humans as well. Possible side effects from the consumption of E. aureum are atopic dermatitis (eczema) as well as burning and/or swelling of the region inside of and surrounding the mouth. Excessive contact with the plant can also lead to general skin irritation or contact dermatitis.

Invasive species 

Epipremnum aureum can become a highly invasive species when introduced into tropical countries where it is not native. In Sri Lanka, it overgrows several hectares of the Udawatta Kele Sanctuary in Kandy. Having no natural enemies, it completely overgrows the forest floor as well as the trunks of trees, causing severe ecological disruption.

It has also invaded the Kurulukele Forest Reserve in Kegalla, Sri Lanka, and other places where it has been planted as a decorative plant, or to hold steep banks along roads. It was included in the Florida Exotic Pest Control Council's 1999 list of invasive species.

A study published in the South African Journal of Botany found the species to be a potential risk of becoming an invasive species along the coasts of South Africa. It suggested a number of different ways to prevent the spreading of the species in the wild, one of which included barring the cultivation of the species outside of an unsupervised area. Additionally, however, the study pointed out that E. aureum cannot propagate on a large scale due to its lack of seed banks as well as its minimal immunity to herbicides. If the plant is maintained in a controlled area, it is not as significant of a threat as when it grows freely in the wild.

Gallery

References

External links

 Pothos Production Guide - discusses care of this plant
 

aureum
Flora of the Society Islands
House plants
Invasive plant species in Sri Lanka
Low light plants